The Iranian Premier Wrestling League is a professional wrestling league in Iran.

League champions

Freestyle

Greco-Roman

See also
 Wrestling in Iran

References

External links
 IAWF
 Iran Wrestling News

Wrest
Freestyle wrestling
League
Professional sports leagues in Iran